The Interconnector is a natural gas pipeline between the United Kingdom and continental Europe.  It crosses the North Sea between Bacton Gas Terminal in England and Zeebrugge in Belgium. Construction of the pipeline was completed in 1998.

It provides bi-directional transport capability to facilitate energy trading in both the UK and continental European gas markets. Gas export from the UK is termed "forward flow" and gas import to the UK is termed "reverse flow". The UK export capacity of the Interconnector is 25.5 billion cubic metres per year.

Economic impact
The pipeline provides not only the physical capability to move gas from one end of the pipe to the other, it has been a key factor in the liberation of energy markets across Europe - enabling energy trading and creating economic activity in the process. Such trading can result in future production being bought and sold because of the possibility of the use of the Interconnector.

Shareholders
Interconnector is owned by Fluxys and Snam;  Fluxys has direct, indirect, and joint shareholdings (with Snam), and Snam have the remainder- a 50% interest in 31.50% held jointly with Fluxys.

See also

BBL Pipeline
Zeebrugge Hub
Nemo link, an electricity interconnector between Belgium and the United Kingdom

References

External links

Belgium–United Kingdom relations
Buildings and structures in Norfolk
Energy infrastructure completed in 1998
Eni
Natural gas pipelines in Belgium
Natural gas pipelines in the United Kingdom
North Sea energy
Pipelines under the North Sea
1998 establishments in Belgium
1998 establishments in England